Randy Ellis (born October 30, 1979 in Chicago, Illinois), better known as DJ Fokis "Bull Of Tha Industry" is a hip hop turntablist/producer and owner of PPEG (Pure Product Entertainment Group, LLC.) a music/marketing consulting firm from Chicago, Illinois, U.S.

Biography
He began his career as a local DJ working with radio stations and running the local DJ battle scene during the late 1990s. DJ Fokis also was a talented graffiti artist known by most of his peers as "Fokis" he went on to have many other aliases such as "Seryus" . At first he studied architecture but the love of music overwhelmed and fascinated him. DJ Fokis in the late 1990s was part of several hip-hop crews including the world renown Chi-Rock Nation where he took part in releasing Chicago Rocks Magazine under supervision of veteran chapter members. DJ Fokis credits himself as a "Triple Threat" DJ. Triple Threat represents the future of turntablism, precisely because they have been so instrumental to its storied past. Though they have championship-level skills at scratching and beat-juggling they also know how to rock a party, produce music and create original compositions with two turntables. They are not just djs, turntablists, producers, musicians or club djs, they encompass all aspects.

The early years
DJ Fokis as a young child studied in Cincinnati, Ohio under the School for Creative & Performing Arts where he majored in art and studied drama. After returning to Chicago his love of art i.e. Graffiti grew during his high school years. While taking an interest in architecture DJ Fokis was awarded the Chicago Public Schools Newhouse Competition second place award and a summer business internship with a Chicago downtown architecture firm. DJ Fokis skills in Graffiti & Art developed more over time. The introduction to graphic design programs such as Adobe Systems Photoshop & Corel Photo-Paint he used the programs to make a living and support for college. After graduation DJ Fokis created a small sole-proprietorship Graphinheit Studios. The unique name was created by DJ Fokis himself combining the words Graphics and Fahrenheit which translates "Hot Graphics". He soon dissolved the company in 2006 and merge his operations. He incorporated PPEG, LLC. to continue his music career and use his marketing intellect for further his career in the entertainment industry. His creativity can be seen locally and internationally mainly because he was the consulting art director for marketing album covers and promotional materials for Clear Channel. In 2007 DJ Fokis opened his doors to other companies for 3rd Party consultation/marketing services. Most recent clients being Chicago rap group Crucial Conflict, Super-Producer 9th Wonder for The "Dream Merchant 2" Tour and Hustle Period Management home to Roc-A-Fella Records RIAA certified multi-platinum artist Kanye West.

Mainstream introduction
DJ Fokis gained fame from releasing "I Can Getcha Block Knocked Off" Vol. 1 September 2006 with then newly signed artist Warlord to infamous Death Row Records. The release executive produced By Suge Knight and Big Los was downloaded over 250,000 times from www.djfokis.com in under 2 months. A second release to the debut street album was soon scheduled and to be released in 2007 under a co-venture between DJ Fokis, Warlord and Death Row Records Vice President Big Los. "Still Can Getcha Block Knocked Off" Vol. 2 was released August 7, 2007 worldwide on with global distribution assistance from Apple iTunes, eMusic, Yahoo, and Sony. It received critical acclaim and amassed high scores from online & offline publications. DJ Fokis & Warlord's success of the series will soon be continued with a new series coming soon from both artist no date has been set.

Current affairs
DJ Fokis on September 25, 2009 recently signed to a New York City based booking agency CEG (Central Entertainment Group). CEG houses the world's top talent ranging from Fabolous, Lil' Kim, Funkmaster Flex, and DJ Whoo Kid. DJ Fokis recently announced that he has confirmed the release for a third installment of the Warlord mixtape entitled: Lord of War: "Still Can Getcha Blocked Knocked Off, Volume 3". It is expected to be released March 2010 with 17 new track from DJ Fokis & Warlord. DJ Fokis has been recently added to a 2010 tour involving the world-famous Ruff Ryders Entertainment the tour launch is expected in January 2010 inside the continental United States.

Philanthropy
DJ Fokis established a non-profit organization entitled The F.O.K.I.S. Foundation the acronym standing for Finding Outstanding Kids In School. This organization was founded to be a cornerstone for kids in an inner city school that may have a talent or skill that can be enhanced/sculpted. The foundations role will be that of an older member that specializes in that skill the child possess and "shows him/her the ropes". A young aspiring singer may have the opportunity to go to a live recording session with a singer, songwriter, or producer and see first hand how things work. A young dancer, to a ballet studio, etc.

Awards & credentials
2007-2008 "Hard DJ Work Award" Midwest Category 2nd Annual Thermal Awards WHCR 90.3 FM New York City, New York
2000-2001 Disco Mix Club (DMC) American Battleground Chicago Regional Finalist
1999-2000 Vestax Guitar Center 1st Round Advance Winner
1999-2000 Shure Blaze Battle Finalist
1997-1998 Heavyweights DJ Competition Finalist

Discography

DJ Fokis Presents: Pure Product: Volume 3.0 January, 1998
Reborn Hustler (DJ Fokis & Spree Israel) December, 2004
Death Row Records Presents: I Can Getcha Block Knocked Off Volume: 1 (DJ Fokis & Warlord) September, 2006
Still Can Getcha Block Knocked Off, Volume 2 (DJ Fokis & Warlord) August, 2007
Reborn Hustler: The Reissue (Bonus Track Version) January, 2008
Bullacratic DJ Fokis Debut Album (Label:TBA)
Lord of War: Still Can Getcha Block Knocked Off, Volume 3 (DJ Fokis & Walord) March, 2010

Notes
RollingOut.com Interview - January, 2009
Sixshot.com "Sixshot Spinners" Interview - April, 2008
Streethop.com "Jack Of All Trades" (3 Part Interview) - July, 2007
Streethop.com Album Review for "Still Can Getcha Block Knocked Off" Volume: 2 - July, 2007
Westcoast Aftershock "Still Can Getcha Block Knocked Off" Volume 2 Album Review - July, 2007
G-Funk Music Inc. "I Can Getcha Block Knocked Off" Volume: 1 Feature Album - March, 2006
Wildstyle Shop & Magazine - The Hip Hop Culture Online Magazine Berlin, Germany  - November, 2006

External links 
Official Website
BullyTV on Youtube
Twitter for DJ Fokis

1979 births
African-American DJs
American hip hop DJs
Mixtape DJs
Record producers from Illinois
Hip hop record producers
Living people
Musicians from Chicago
Musicians from Illinois
21st-century African-American people
20th-century African-American people